Joseph Verhaert (6 September 1927 – 19 December 1999) was a Belgian racing cyclist. He rode in the 1949 Tour de France.

Top results
The following were Verhaert's best results:

 Grand Prix de Wallonie  ('50)
 Circuit Hesbaye - Condroz  ('49)
 Hoeilaart - Diest - Hoeilaart  ('54)
 5th Omloop Het Volk  ('50)
 8th La Flèche Wallonne  ('50)
 10th La Flèche Wallonne  ('49)
 5th Nationale Sluitingprijs Putte-Kapellen  ('54)
 2x 2nd stage Tour of Belgium  ('51, '50)
 7th GC Tour of Belgium  ('50)
 10th Scheldeprijs  ('53)

References

External links

1927 births
1999 deaths
Belgian male cyclists
Cyclists from Antwerp
20th-century Belgian people